"Little Wonder" is a song by English musician David Bowie, released as the second single from his 21st album, Earthling (1997). It was the album's biggest hit, reaching number 14 in the UK. At the 1998 Brit Awards, the song was nominated for Best British Video.

Background
The sampled spoken line "If it's good to ya, it's gotta be good for ya" during the instrumental break, comes from the spoken intro of a live Steely Dan song called "Bodhisattva" from the Citizen Steely Dan box.

Two main interpretations to the lyrics are given by James E. Perone, who writes that the song may simply represent some characteristics of Bowie's own personality or, in another case, an alien observing aspects of the life on Earth. Bowie uses the names of all seven dwarfs in the lyrics.

The drum break is sampled from The Winstons instrumental, "Amen, Brother", a popular drum solo and sample commonly referred to as the "Amen break". while the chord progression is similar to an early David Bowie song, "Can't Help Thinking About Me."

Critical reception
British magazine Music Week rated the song three out of five, adding, "The idea of giving Bowie a drum & bass makeover sounds slightly absurd but, though disconcerting, it seems to work. The central song, however, is a little understated and something a little more bold might have worked better." David Sinclair from The Times wrote, "Racing jungle beats and strafing bursts of ultra-distorted guitar underpin the first taster from Bowie's new album, Earthling. Quite a grower even if it does sound, in places, disconcertingly like Babylon Zoo."

Live versions
Bowie performed "Little Wonder" as the opening song at his fiftieth birthday celebration concert in New York City on 9 January 1997. This performance was included on the Earthling in the City CD. Bowie played the song live (along with "Scary Monsters (And Super Creeps)") on the 8 February 1997 episode of Saturday Night Live. A July 1997 performance at the Phoenix Festival was released in 2021 on Look at the Moon! (Live Phoenix Festival 97). The song was performed at the GQ Awards in New York City on 15 October 1997, later released on the live album LiveAndWell.com in 2000. Bowie's 25 June 2000 performance of the song at the Glastonbury Festival was released in 2018 on Glastonbury 2000. A live version recorded at BBC Radio Theatre, London, on 27 June 2000 was released on the bonus disc accompanying the first releases of Bowie at the Beeb in 2000.

Other releases
 The "Danny Saber remix" appeared on the soundtrack for the European release of The Saint as well as the second soundtrack for the movie Hackers. This remix also appeared on the four-track bonus disc that followed the live album LiveAndWell.com in 2000.
 A video edit was released on a Jukebox 7" release of the single "Dead Man Walking" in 1997.
 Three remixes, "Censored Video Edit", "Junior Vasquez Club Mix" and "Danny Saber Dance Mix", also appeared on the bonus disc of the Digibook Expanded Edition of Earthling from 2004.
 The single version has been included on compilation albums: some editions of Best of Bowie (2002), the 3-disc and 2-disc versions of Nothing Has Changed (2014), and the 2-disc edition of Bowie Legacy (2016).
 A new 'Unplugged' Danny Saber Mix was released on streaming services to commemorate Earthling's 25th anniversary in February 2022.

Music video
The accompanying music video for "Little Wonder" was directed by Floria Sigismondi, an Italian-Canadian photographer and director. It is set in a dystopian world of mutants, depicting rapid-pace shots of Bowie as an aging Ziggy Stardust and Halloween Jack wandering the New York streets and subways. The video includes video sculptures by the artist Tony Oursler. Bowie has said of Sigismondi's work, "I thought she just has a wonderful eye, great textures, fabulous cutting." The video is in the permanent collection of the Museum of Modern Art, New York.

Track listings

 UK CD version one
 "Little Wonder" (edit) – 3:40
 "Little Wonder" (Ambient Junior Mix) – 9:55
 "Little Wonder" (Club Dub Junior Mix) – 8:10
 "Little Wonder" (4/4 Junior Mix) – 8:10
 "Little Wonder" (Juniors Club Instrumental) – 8:14

 UK CD version two (limited edition)
 "Little Wonder" (edit) – 3:40
 "Telling Lies" (Adam F Mix) – 3:58
 "Jump They Say" (Leftfield 12" Vocal Mix) – 7:40
 "Little Wonder" (Danny Saber Mix)" – 3:06

 US CD version
 "Little Wonder" (Album version) – 6:02
 "Little Wonder" (Ambient Junior Mix) – 9:55
 "Little Wonder" (Club Dub Junior Mix) – 8:10
 "Little Wonder" (Danny Saber Dance Mix) – 5:30

 European CD version one
 "Little Wonder" (Album version) – 6:02
 "Little Wonder" (Ambient Junior Mix) – 9:55
 "Little Wonder" (Danny Saber Mix) – 3:06
 "Little Wonder" (Club Dub Junior Mix) – 8:10
 "Little Wonder" (4/4 Junior Mix) – 8:10

 European CD version two
 "Little Wonder" (edit) – 3:40
 "Little Wonder" (Junior Club Mix) – 8:10
 "Telling Lies" (Adam F Mix) – 3:58

 European CD version three
 "Little Wonder" (edit) – 3:40
 "Telling Lies" (Adam F Mix) – 3:58

 Japanese CD version
 "Little Wonder" (edit) – 3:40
 "Little Wonder" (Junior Club Mix) – 8:10
 "Little Wonder" (Danny Saber Mix) – 3:06
 "Little Wonder" (Club Dub Junior Mix) – 8:10
 "Little Wonder" (4/4 Junior Mix) – 8:10

 UK 12" version
 "Little Wonder" (Junior Club Mix) – 8:10
 "Little Wonder" (Danny Saber Mix) – 5:30
 "Telling Lies" (Adam F Mix) – 3:58

 European 12" version
 "Little Wonder" (Junior Club Mix) – 8:10
 "Little Wonder" (Danny Saber Mix) – 5:30

An additional three promo CD singles were also released.

Production credits
Producer
 David Bowie
 Mark Plati – 
 Reeves Gabrels – 

Musicians
 David Bowie – vocals, samples, guitar, keyboards
 Reeves Gabrels – programming, real and sampled guitars, vocals
 Mark Plati – drum loops, electronic percussion, programming, loops, samples
 Gail Ann Dorsey – bass
 Zachary Alford – drums
 Mike Garson – keyboards, piano

Charts

Cover versions
 Haitian Hate Gods – .2 Contamination: A Tribute to David Bowie (2006)
 Idiots Loop - Cover Ups (2019)

References

1997 songs
1997 singles
David Bowie songs
Music videos directed by Floria Sigismondi
Parlophone singles
Songs written by David Bowie
Songs written by Reeves Gabrels
Song recordings produced by David Bowie
Jungle music songs